Mohsin Saleh Rashid Al-Harbi (born 22 September 1980), commonly known as Mohsin Al-Harbi, is an Omani footballer who plays for Sur SC.

Club career statistics

International career
Mohsin was part of the first team squad of the Oman national football team from 1997 to 2002. He was selected for the national team for the first time in 1997. He has made an appearance in the 2002 FIFA World Cup qualification.

Honours

Club
With Sur
Omani League (0): Runners-up 1997–98, 2001–02
Sultan Qaboos Cup (1): 2007; Runners-up 2006
Omani Federation Cup (1): 2007
Oman Super Cup (0): Runners-up 2008
With Al-Suwaiq
Oman Elite League (2): 2009–10, 2010–11
Sultan Qaboos Cup (1): 2008
Oman Super Cup (0): Runners-up 2009, 2010, 2011

References

External links
 
 
 Mohsin Al-Harbi at Goal.com
 
 

1980 births
Living people
Omani footballers
Oman international footballers
Association football midfielders
Sur SC players
Suwaiq Club players
Oman Professional League players
Footballers at the 1998 Asian Games
Asian Games competitors for Oman